Nathang Valley (also spelt as Natang, Gnathong, Gnathang Valley) is located in Gangtok district, Sikkim of India. As per the 2011 census of India, Gnathang village covers 486 hectares housing 913 households with a total population of 8,860 (7,455 males, 1,405 females). 

The Nathang Valley is part of the Gnathang-Machong Vidhan Sabha constituency of the Sikkim Legislative Assembly.

History 
On 22 May 1888 Tibetan and British forces clashed at Gnathong (this was part of the Anglo-Tibetan war of 1888). The Lieutenant-Governor of Bengal was present during the clash.

Gnathang village 

With a population of around 350 residents, Gnathang has played a role in the construction of border roads in the area including those to Doka La. From a nearby ridge, the plateau of Doklam is visible, which is around 35 km away. Yaks reared by the village are used as food.

Gallery

Locations

Maps

References

External links 

 Mary Ann Issac (5 April 2020). Nathang Village, Sikkim- A photo tour! Stories from my Backpack.

 Pakyong district